Kaveh Solhekol is an English sports journalist and sport television presenter for Sky Sports.

Career 
A native of London, England, Solhekol is a sports journalist for Sky Sports, having previously worked for The Times.

References

External links 
 
 

Living people
Association football journalists
English sports journalists
English television presenters
English people of Iranian descent
Sky Sports presenters and reporters
Television personalities from London
Year of birth missing (living people)